The Strona di Postua is a  long torrent in the Piedmont region of northwestern Italy.

Etymology
The name Strona comes from storn or strom, celtic roots for "flowing waters" or "river". Postua is a comune located in the valley formed by the Strona.

Geography 
The Strona di Postua starts in the Biellese Alps with two branches which meet at Alpe Aigra. It then flows from NW to SE reaching the village of Roncole and the inhabited part of its valley. After flanking Postua and Guardabosone it enters into the Valsessera and flows into the river Sessera near Crevacuore.

See also 
 Alpi Biellesi

References

Other projects

Rivers of the Province of Biella
Rivers of the Province of Vercelli
Rivers of Italy